RMA Gold Airways was a proposed Australian airline. It was a proposed Australian regular public transport and cargo airline to be based in Melbourne operating under the trading name of Gold Airways. It was planned that the airline would fly a fleet of Airbus A320, Boeing 747 and Embraer 190 aircraft to Australian capital cities and popular regional centres and eventually, with the larger aircraft, to international destinations.

It had been proposed by former Ansett employees. The RMA stood for Reginald Miles Ansett, the founder of Ansett.

Until September 2012, RMA Gold Airways Limited had been listed in the Australian Business Register, having previously been known as Ansett Limited from 17 February 2004 until 21 June 2004, and then RMA Gold Airways Limited until its deregistration in 2014.

References 

Proposed airlines of Australia